Forficula paleocaenica, is a fossil species of earwigs, of the family Forficulidae. It was found in Denmark, dating to the Eocene.

Forficulidae
Insects described in 1990
Eocene insects
Fossils of Denmark
Fur Formation